The Dover School District is a comprehensive community public school district that serves students in pre-kindergarten through twelfth grade from Dover in Morris County, New Jersey, United States.

As of the 2021–22 school year, the district, comprised of five schools, had an enrollment of 3,448 students and 244.6 classroom teachers (on an FTE basis), for a student–teacher ratio of 14.1:1.

The district is classified by the New Jersey Department of Education as being in District Factor Group "A", the lowest of eight groupings. District Factor Groups organize districts statewide to allow comparison by common socioeconomic characteristics of the local districts. From lowest socioeconomic status to highest, the categories are A, B, CD, DE, FG, GH, I and J.

Students in grades K-12 from Victory Gardens attend the schools of the Dover School District, which has been consolidated since 2010. Students in grades 7-12 from Mine Hill Township participate in the Dover district as part of a sending/receiving relationship.

Schools
Schools in the district (with 2021–22 enrollment from the National Center for Education Statistics) are:
Elementary schools
Academy Street Elementary School with 470 students in grades K-6
Nicholas Edwards, Principal
East Dover Elementary School with 389 students in grades K-6
Joshua Chuy, Principal
North Dover Elementary School with 658 students in grades PreK-6
Heather D. Carlton, Principal
Middle school
Dover Middle School with 524 students in grades 7-8
Luis A. Jaime Jr., Principal
High school
Dover High School with 1,094 students in grades 9-12
Freddy R. Nuñez, Principal

Administration
Core members of the district's administration are:
Dr. James McLaughlin, Superintendent
Raymond Slamb, Business Administrator / Board Secretary

Board of education
The district's board of education, comprised of nine members, sets policy and oversees the fiscal and educational operation of the district through its administration. As a Type II school district, the board's trustees are elected directly by voters to serve three-year terms of office on a staggered basis, with three seats up for election each year held (since 2012) as part of the November general election. The board appoints a superintendent to oversee the district's day-to-day operations and a business administrator to supervise the business functions of the district.

References

External links
Dover School District
 
Data for the Dover School District, National Center for Education Statistics

Dover, New Jersey
New Jersey District Factor Group A
School districts in Morris County, New Jersey
Victory Gardens, New Jersey